Mărculești is a commune located in Ialomița County, Muntenia, Romania. It is composed of a single village, Mărculești, part of Cosâmbești Commune until 2005.

References

Communes in Ialomița County
Localities in Muntenia